Texas A&M–Corpus Christi Islanders basketball may refer to either of the basketball teams that represent the Texas A&M University–Corpus Christi:
Texas A&M–Corpus Christi Islanders men's basketball
Texas A&M–Corpus Christi Islanders women's basketball